Charles Josias Wampatuck (died after 1695) was a sachem of the Massachusett tribe in the late 17th century.

Name 
The 1695 quit-claim deed to Boston lists "Charles Josias, alias Josias Wampatuck, grandson of Chikataubut." His names are alternatively spelled as Josiah and Wompatuck.

Family and background 
Charles' paternal grandfather was Chikataubut (d. 1633), also written as Chikatawbut. Charles' father was Wampatuck (ca. 1629–1669), also written as Wompatuck, Josias Wampatuck, Josiah Wompatuck, and Josias Sagamore. Wampatuck served as sachem of the Massachusetts tribe until his death in 1669.

Career 
After Wompatuck's death, Charles was a minor so a regent acted on his behalf until he came of age.

In 1671, Charles Josiah became sachem. In 1684 and 1685, Charles Josiah Wampatuck signed various deeds and confirmatory deeds affirming his grandfather's transfer of Boston, Stoughton, Dedham, Mansfield, Norton, and other areas to the colonists decades earlier. A deed dated 1686–87 relinquished title of Conhassett lands, present-day Scituate, Massachusetts, was signed "Josias Wampatuck, son and heir to Josias Wampatuck," and he was paid £14.

Wampatuck had been an ally to the British colonists. Historian Samuel Deane wrote that Charles Josiah was the son of Jeremy, son of Josiah Wampatuck, which would make Charles the grandson of Wamputuck as opposed to his son, and Deane dramatically declared, "Charles Josiah (son of Jeremy) was the last of his race."

Notes

References
 
 

Year of death unknown
17th-century Native Americans
King Philip's War
Massachusett people
Native American history of Massachusetts
Native American leaders
Native American people from Massachusetts
People of colonial Massachusetts
Pre-statehood history of Massachusetts
Year of birth unknown